Acromantinae is a subfamily of the mantis family Hymenopodidae which contains two tribes and about 13 genera.

Tribes and genera
The Mantodea Species File lists:

Tribe Acromantini
Acromantis Saussure, 1870
Ambivia Stal, 1877
Citharomantis Rehn, 1909
Majangella Giglio-Tos, 1915, synonym: Ephippiomantis Werner, 1922
Metacromantis Beier, 1930
Oligomantis Giglio-Tos, 1915
Parapsychomantis Shcherbakov, 2017
Psychomantis Giglio-Tos, 1915
Rhomantis Giglio-Tos, 1915

Tribe Otomantini
Anasigerpes Giglio-Tos, 1915
Chrysomantis Giglio-Tos, 1915, synonym: Anoplosigerpes Werner, 1928
Otomantis Bolivar, 1890
Oxypiloidea Schulthess, 1898

Now placed elsewhere:
Anaxarcha Stal, 1877 (in Hymenopodinae)
Ephestiasula Giglio-Tos, 1915 (in Oxypilinae, synonym: Parahestiasula Lombardo, 1995)
Heliomantis Giglio-Tos, 1915 (in Hymenopodinae)
Hestiasula Saussure, 1871 (in Oxypilinae)
Odontomantis Saussure, 1871 (in Hymenopodinae)

See also
List of mantis genera and species

References

 
Hymenopodidae
Mantodea subfamilies
Taxa named by Ermanno Giglio-Tos